This is a list of diplomatic missions in Somalia.

Embassies in Mogadishu

Consulate-General in Garoowe

Closed embassies
 (date unknown)
 (closed in 1981)

Non-resident embassies
Resident in Addis Ababa, Ethiopia:

Resident in Nairobi, Kenya:

Resident elsewhere

 (Muscat) 
 (Cairo)
 (Pretoria)
 (Pretoria)
 (Riyadh)
 (Khartoum) 
 (Djibouti City)
 (Khartoum)
 (Djibouti City)
 (Pretoria)
 (Sana'a)
 (Dar-Es-Salaam)

See also
Foreign relations of Somalia
List of diplomatic missions of Somalia
List of diplomatic missions in Somaliland

Notes

References

Somalia
List
Diplomatic missions